Nardeh Shahr (also Romanized as Nardeh-ye Shahr; also known as Nīdeh Shahr and Nīdshahr) is a village in Balesh Rural District, in the Central District of Darab County, Fars Province, Iran. At the 2006 census, its population was 750, in 170 families.

References 

Populated places in Darab County